Bắc Mê is a rural district of Hà Giang province in the Northeast region of Vietnam. As of 2019, the district had a population of 54 592. The district covers an area of 844 km2. The district capital lies at Yên Phú.

Administrative divisions
Bắc Mê District consists of the district capital, Yên Phú, and 12 communes: Đường Âm, Đường Hồng, Giáp Trung, Lạc Nông, Minh Ngọc, Minh Sơn, Phiêng Luông, Phú Nam, Thượng Tân, Yên Cường, Yên Định and Yên Phong.

References

Districts of Hà Giang province
Hà Giang province